The Port Terminal of Moín,  (Spanish: Terminal Portuaria de Moín), whose official name is Gastón Kogan Kogan Terminal, is located in the Moín bay, west to the city of Limón, is one of the seaports in the Caribbean coast of Costa Rica. Not to be confused with the Moín Container Terminal operated by APM Terminals.

See also
 Port of Limón, operated by JAPDEVA.
 Moín Container Terminal, operated by APM Terminals.

References

External links
 JAPDEVA's (Costa Rica's Caribbean Ports Authority) information about the Terminal at Limón

Port settlements in Central America
Transport in Costa Rica
Buildings and structures in Limón Province